Chorode  is a village in Kozhikode district in the state of Kerala, India.

Demographics
 India census, Chorode had a population of 35437 with 17019 males and 18418 females. This is situated nearly 3 km away from Vatakara town which is in Kozhikode district and around 18 km away from Thalassery town.

Transportation
National Highway 17 (NH-17) is passing through chorode and there is an overbridge built for this road at its intersection with the railway track.  Before the exisistance of the overbridge that locality was known as 'chorode gate' as there was a staffed railway level crossing (i.e. railway gate).

Major Establishments/organizations
 Rani Public School
 Rani Food Products
 Chennamangalam Temple
 Ganapathi Temple (Theru)
 Kuriyadi Kurumba Bhagavathy Temple
 Thalokal Mahavishnu temple

References 

Vatakara area